Todor Stoykov (born 3 March 1977 in Varna) is a Bulgarian retired professional basketball player, who played for Cherno More, Cordivari Roseto, Scafati Basket, Valencia BC and Lukoil Academic. At 1.98 m, his position was shooting guard/small forward. He was also a member of the Bulgarian national basketball team, before retiring in 2009.

Professional career
While playing with PBC Lukoil Academic, he is the all-time Leader of the ULEB Cup in total points scored (1102), assists (190), minutes played (2364), fouls against (305) and also in total Index Rating (914). Stoykov also ranks third in free-throws made (326). He was the all-time leader for three-pointers made (169) until November 2014 when Marko Popović beat that mark.

Stoykov announced his retirement at the end of the 2012–13 season. He was honored by the Lukoil Academic by becoming the first player in team history to have his number retired by the team; his #15 was raised to the rafters.

Honours
Cherno More
 Bulgarian Basketball League champion (2 times): 1998, 1999
 Bulgarian Basketball Cup (3 times): 1998, 1999, 2000

Lukoil Academic
 Bulgarian Basketball League champion (10 times): 2003, 2004, 2005, 2007, 2008, 2009, 2010, 2011, 2012, 2013
 Bulgarian Basketball Cup (6 times): 2002, 2003, 2004, 2007, 2008, 2011, 2012, 2013
 FIBA Europe Conference South: winners (1): 2003

References

External links
 Profile at Eurocupbasketball.com

1977 births
Living people
Bulgarian men's basketball players
Liga ACB players
PBC Academic players
Roseto Sharks players
Scafati Basket players
Shooting guards
Small forwards
Sportspeople from Varna, Bulgaria
Valencia Basket players